De Regno may refer to:

 De Regno (Synesius) - 4th Century Speech by Synesius
 De Regno, to the King of Cyprus - 1267 Work by Thomas Aquinas